East Ridge is a city in Hamilton County, Tennessee,  United States. As of the 2020 census, the city population was 22,167. East Ridge is bordered by Chattanooga to the west, north, and east, and the Georgia state line to the south. It is part of the Chattanooga, TN–GA Metropolitan Statistical Area. The name of the city comes from its location due east of Missionary Ridge. The Bachman Tubes beneath Missionary Ridge link East Ridge with downtown Chattanooga.

History

Geography
East Ridge is located at  (34.996674, -85.237482).

Demographics

2020 census

As of the 2020 United States census, there were 22,167 people, 9,027 households, and 5,086 families residing in the city.

2000 census
As of the census of 2000, there were 20,640 people, 9,288 households, and 5,739 families residing in the city. The population density was 2,497.3 people per square mile (964.8/km2). There were 9,876 housing units at an average density of 1,194.9 per square mile (461.6/km2). The racial makeup of the city was 93.32% White, 3.21% African American, 0.31% Native American, 1.68% Asian, 0.03% Pacific Islander, 0.43% from other races, and 1.02% from two or more races. Hispanic or Latino of any race were 1.09% of the population.

There were 9,288 households, out of which 24.1% had children under the age of 18 living with them, 47.1% were married couples living together, 11.5% had a female householder with no husband present, and 38.2% were non-families. 33.2% of all households were made up of individuals, and 13.3% had someone living alone who was 65 years of age or older. The average household size was 2.20 and the average family size was 2.80.

In the city, the population was spread out, with 19.5% under the age of 18, 8.7% from 18 to 24, 29.1% from 25 to 44, 23.7% from 45 to 64, and 19.0% who were 65 years of age or older. The median age was 40 years. For every 100 females, there were 88.0 males. For every 100 females age 18 and over, there were 83.0 males.

The median income for a household in the city was $36,347, and the median income for a family was $43,858. Males had a median income of $31,359 versus $23,659 for females. The per capita income for the city was $20,346. About 6.7% of families and 8.0% of the population were below the poverty line, including 10.7% of those under age 18 and 7.0% of those age 65 or over.

Arts and culture

The East Ridge City Library is located within the City Hall. In 2008 the East Ridge History Center opened showcasing local history and culture. A community center is also available for use by the public. Located next to City Hall and the Pioneer Frontier Playground, it offers programs for the community.

Sports
East Ridge is home to three minor league level professional soccer clubs who all play their home matches at CHI Memorial Stadium a 2,500 seat soccer-specific stadium with a planned finished capacity of 5500. It was the first soccer-specific stadium built in Tennessee. It officially opened August 1, 2020.

The Chattanooga Red Wolves SC are a men's club that competes in USL League One, the third tier of US Men's professional soccer The Chattanooga Lady Red Wolves, a women's club will begin play in 2023 as members of the USL W League, the second tier of Women's US pro soccer which began play in 2022. The Dalton Red Wolves of USL League Two,a semi-professional developmental soccer league sponsored by United Soccer Leagues in the United States and Canada, forming part of the United States soccer league system

Parks and recreation

Camp Jordan is a local park and an arena. The arena provides space for special and sporting events. Camp Jordan has 13 ball fields, nine soccer fields, an amphitheater, RV spaces, a sand volleyball court, picnic pavilion, fishing pond, playground, and a walking track. East Ridge is home to the East Ridge Soccer Association, which provides soccer programs for youth and adults. The East Ridge Baseball/Softball Association supports ball games for boys and girls.
Pioneer Frontover Playground is located by city hall on Tombras Avenue and includes a splash pad which opened in 2022.

Government

East Ridge is a Home-Rule city with a City Manager-Council form of government with an elected Mayor.

Politics

Education

East Ridge has four public schools, which are part of the Hamilton County Schools system: East Ridge Elementary, Spring Creek Elementary, East Ridge Middle School, and East Ridge High School, as well as two private schools: Belvoir Christian Academy and Our Lady of Perpetual Help Catholic School.

Infrastructure

The East Ridge Police Department maintains public safety within the city and is a full service and state certified agency, and also serves the city of Ridgeside. The City of East Ridge Animal Services Division provides animal services by way of animal control and an animal shelter for the city.

Utilities

Public utilities are provided by Chattanooga Gas Company, Tennessee American Water Company, AT&T, EPB, and Comcast.

Health

East Ridge is home to Parkridge East Hospital, a branch of Parkridge Medical Center.

Notable people
Elbert Eugene Spriggs (1937-2021), founder of the Twelve Tribes cult group

References

External links
 Official website
 City charter

Cities in Tennessee
Cities in Hamilton County, Tennessee
Cities in the Chattanooga metropolitan area